The 1994 Copa del Rey Final was the 92nd final of the Spanish cup competition, the Copa del Rey. The final was played at Vicente Calderón Stadium in Madrid on 20 April 1994. The match was won by Real Zaragoza, who beat Celta de Vigo in penalty shoot-out.

Details

References

1994
1
RC Celta de Vigo matches
Real Zaragoza matches
Association football penalty shoot-outs